Garden Plain may refer to:
 Garden Plain, Alberta, Canada
 Garden Plain, Kansas, United States
 Garden Plain Township, Whiteside County, Illinois, United States
 Garden Plain Township, Sedgwick County, Kansas, United States